Rodney Lyons (24 April 1924 – 19 July 2013) was an Australian cricketer. He played in nineteen first-class matches for Queensland between 1955 and 1959.

See also
 List of Queensland first-class cricketers

References

External links
 

1924 births
2013 deaths
Australian cricketers
Queensland cricketers
Sportspeople from Cairns
Cricketers from Queensland